Nawab Zahid Khan was the Afghan ruler of Multan. He was father of Shuja Khan and grand father of Nawab Muzaffar Khan. He was the first person of his family who became Nawab of Multan in 1738 following the invasion of Nader Shah. He died in 1749 in a battle at Multan with the Mughals.

References 

1749 deaths
Year of birth missing
Pashtun people
Pashtun dynasties
Durrani dynasty
History of Multan
Emirs of Afghanistan
Afghan expatriates in Pakistan
18th-century Afghan people